Rusangu University, formerly known as Zambia Adventist University, is a private coeducational Christian university based in Rusangu Mission near Monze in Zambia. It is owned and operated by the Seventh-day Adventist Church.  This is considered one of the best universities in Zambia and in Africa region.  This is known for its academic standards and research contributions.

It is a part of the Seventh-day Adventist education system, the world's second largest Christian school system.

History

In 1903 William Harrison Anderson, a Christian missionary of the Seventh-day Adventist denomination, crossed the Zambezi River from Solusi Mission in Zimbabwe to set up the Rusangu Mission in Zambia in 1905. King Lewanika of the Barotse people had invited Anderson to come into his territory and establish the mission.

Anderson walked 900 miles before deciding on a location. He described how he chose the site:

Anderson and his wife arrived on the farm the fifth of September 1905. He built their home, planted a garden, developed a farm, built a school-house, taught the school, and acted as doctor and nurse to the people who came to the station for help.

From this mission station, grew the Rusangu Primary School, the Rusangu Secondary School and eventually in 1975 the Rusangu Ministerial School. In 1993, the Rusangu Ministerial School changed its name to Zambia Adventist Seminary. A year later in 1994, the Seminary was closed to pave way for re-organization.

In 1997, plans to re-open the Seminary brought the idea of the Zambia Adventist College that would offer other courses in addition to theology and pastoral training. In 2000, an in-service program for serving church pastors began at Riverside Farm Institute in collaboration with Solusi University. With the full development of the Zambia Adventist College idea, this pastors' program finally moved back to the historic Rusangu Mission site in May 2003. Rapid developments have since given birth to a full-fledged Zambia Adventist university, now Rusangu University.

Academic divisions

Notable alumni
 Rupiah Banda, former Zambian President, PhD in Political Science
 Kenneth Kaunda, First President of Zambia, PhD in Political Science

See also

 List of Seventh-day Adventist colleges and universities
 Seventh-day Adventist education
 Seventh-day Adventist Church
 Seventh-day Adventist theology
 History of the Seventh-day Adventist Church
Adventist Colleges and Universities

References

External links 
 
Zambia Adventist University graduates first class with new government accreditation
RB conferred with honorary doctorate degree
Zambian Adventist University graduates first class
https://www.hea.org.zm/
https://www.zaqa.gov.zm/higher-education-institutions/
https://www.mohe.gov.zm/ 

Universities and colleges affiliated with the Seventh-day Adventist Church
Rusangu University of Rusangu
Universities in Zambia
Educational institutions established in 2002
2002 establishments in Zambia
Buildings and structures in Southern Province, Zambia